The following is a list of settlements in Sri Lanka with a population over 50,000.

Cities

References

External links

 
Sri Lanka
Cities
Cities
Sri Lanka